Princess Amalie of Saxe-Coburg and Gotha (Marie Luise Franziska Amalie; 23 October 1848 – 6 May 1894) was a Princess of Saxe-Coburg and Gotha by birth and a Duchess in Bavaria through her marriage to Duke Maximilian Emanuel in Bavaria. Amalie was the fourth child and second eldest daughter of Prince August of Saxe-Coburg and Gotha and his wife Princess Clémentine of Orléans. Her youngest brother was Ferdinand I of Bulgaria and her paternal uncle was Ferdinand II of Portugal.

Life

Early years 

Princess Amalie was born in Coburg, Germany, to Prince August of Saxe-Coburg and Gotha and his wife, Princess Clémentine of Orléans. Since childhood, Amalie had been intended as the bride of Prince Leopold of Bavaria. However, Duke Maximilian Emanuel in Bavaria fell in love with her and confided this love to his sister Elisabeth.

Elisabeth—the empress of Austria and queen of Hungary—became determined to ensure her favorite brother's happiness, for she invited Leopold to an extended visit with the imperial family, among those who attended was her own fifteen-year-old daughter Archduchess Gisela of Austria. There, Leopold was tactfully made aware that a marriage with Gisela would be looked upon with favor by Emperor Franz Joseph. If Leopold was to marry Gisela, he would become the emperor’s son-in-law; upon realizing this, he accepted and became engaged to Gisela after only a few days.

Marriage 
Duke Maximillian and Princess Amalie were married on 20 September 1875 in Ebenthal, Lower Austria, Austria-Hungary. The marriage was, by all accounts, a very happy one.

Children 
Amalie and Maximilian Emanuel had three children:

Siegfried, Duke in Bavaria (10 July 1876 – 12 March 1952)
Christoph Joseph Clemens, Duke in Bavaria (22 April 1879 – 10 July 1963)
Luitpold Emanuel, Duke in Bavaria (30 June 1890 – 16 January 1973)

Death 
On 6 May 1894, at the age of 45, Princess Amalie died due to peritonitis.

Ancestry

References

Bibliography 
 Damien Bilteryst, Olivier Defrance, Joseph van Loon: Les Biederstein, cousins oubliés de la reine Élisabeth, années 1875-1906. Museum Dynasticum, Bruxelles, XXXIV/1 2022.

1848 births
1894 deaths
People from Coburg
Princesses of Saxe-Coburg and Gotha
Duchesses of Bavaria